Kenneth Edward Ayres (born 15 May 1956, in Oxford, UK) is an English former professional footballer who played in the Football League, as a forward. He started out as an apprentice with Manchester United and received a professional contract with the club at the age of 17, but left a year later. He signed for Crystal Palace in November 1973, where he played six times for the Selhurst Park side in the Third Division during the 1974–75 season, his only League appearances. His contract was cancelled in April 1976 and he subsequently played in Norway for IF Fram Larvik.

References

1956 births
Living people
Footballers from Oxford
English footballers
Association football forwards
Manchester United F.C. players
Crystal Palace F.C. players
English Football League players
Expatriate footballers in Iceland
English expatriate footballers